Events from the year 1817 in Denmark.

Incumbents
 Monarch – Frederick VI
 Prime minister – Joachim Godske Moltke

Events

Undated

Culture

Art
 Christoffer Wilhelm Eckersberg completes The Death of Balder as his admission painted for admission into the Royal Danish Academy of Fine Arts.
 The 300th aniversary of the Reformation is commemorated with a medal designed by Salomon Ahron Jacobson.

Births
 22 January – Johan Frederik Schlegel, lawyer and civil servant (died 1896)
 22 February – Niels Gade, composer (died 1890)
 4 April – P. C. Skovgaard, national romantic landscape painter (died 1875)
13 June – Knud Graah, industrial pioneer (died 1909).
 20 July – Johan Henrik Nebelong, architect (died 1871)
 13 November – Franziska Carlsen, writer and local historian (died 1876)
 17 November – Harald Conradsen, sculptor and medalist (died 1905)

Date unknown
 Carl Otto Reventlow, philologist, developed a mnemonic system (died 1873)

Deaths
 6 April – Joachim Castenschiold, military officer (born 1743)
 28 November – Johan Frederik Schultz printer and publisher (born 1756)

Date unknown 
 Johanne Marie Malleville, royal favorite (born 1750)
 Moses Melchior, businessman (born 1837)

References

External links

 
1810s in Denmark
Denmark
Years of the 19th century in Denmark